Gavriil (Gabriel) Bertrain (Bertren) (2 August 1869 – 25 October 1939) was a French and Russian military officer and Russian fencer. He competed in three events at the 1912 Summer Olympics.

References

External links
 

1869 births
1939 deaths
Male fencers from the Russian Empire
Olympic competitors for the Russian Empire
Fencers at the 1912 Summer Olympics